Osrblie is a village and municipality in Brezno District, in the Banská Bystrica Region of central Slovakia. The village is best known for biathlon races, with Biathlon World Cup events taking place since the mid-1990s and with one Biathlon World Championships in 1997. It also hosted the biathlon event at the 2015 Winter Universiade.

History
In historical records the village was first mentioned in 1580, although it was established much sooner, around the second half of the 15th century, with the reference to the iron ore mining, which lasted until the 19th century.

Geography
The municipality lies at an altitude of 580 metres and covers and area of 24.03 km². It had a population of 391 inhabitants on 31 December 2013.

References

External links

 Official website 
 http://www.statistics.sk/mosmis/eng/run.html

Villages and municipalities in Brezno District
Ski areas and resorts in Slovakia